The 2018 Maui Invitational Tournament was an early-season college basketball tournament played for the 35th time.  The tournament began in 1984, and was part of the 2018–19 NCAA Division I men's basketball season. The Championship Round was played at the Lahaina Civic Center in Maui, Hawaii from November 19 to 21, 2018.

Bracket

Source:

References

Maui Invitational Tournament
Maui Invitational
Maui Invitational
Maui Invitational